Tsukagoshi (written: 塚越) is a Japanese surname. Notable people with the surname include:

, Japanese aviator and explorer
, Japanese cyclist

Japanese-language surnames